Marco Cellini (born 19 May 1981) is an Italian former footballer who played as a forward, and current head coach of Promozione amateurs Grassina.

Playing career
Born in the Campo di Marte Florence neighbourhood, next to the local Artemio Franchi stadium, Cellini started his career with Serie C2 team Prato, where he played until 2002 (except for a one-year loan at amateur team Fucecchio in 1999–2000). In 2002, he moved to Montevarchi, another Tuscan Serie C2 club, where he spent two seasons. In 2004, he signed for Serie C1 team Foggia, and scored 12 goals in his season with the satanelli. He moved to ambitious side Perugia the next season, scoring 16 goals in 32 matches with the grifoni.

In the 2006 summer window, Cellini signed for Serie B minnows U.C. AlbinoLeffe, where he scored seven goals in his first season with the Lombardians. In the following season, he proved to be a protagonist of his side's surprising season start, helping AlbinoLeffe to top the league table scoring 11 goals in the initial 14 matches, that season AlbinoLeffe finished 4th, the best result in recent seasons.

In January 2008, he extended his contract to 30 June 2010.

In July 2010 he left for newly promoted side Varese, signed a reported 2-year contract, which Varese also loaned their striker Matteo Momentè to AlbinoLeffe.

On 31 January 2011, he was swapped with Alemão of Vicenza.

Coaching career
On 25 October 2022, Cellini took on his first managerial role, becoming new head coach of Tuscan Promozione amateur club Grassina.

References

External links
Gazzetta dello Sport profile
 

1981 births
Living people
Footballers from Florence
Association football forwards
Italian footballers
Italian football managers
U.C. AlbinoLeffe players
Calcio Foggia 1920 players
A.C. Perugia Calcio players
S.S.D. Varese Calcio players
A.C. Prato players
Modena F.C. players
S.S. Juve Stabia players
Carrarese Calcio players
S.P.A.L. players
U.S. Livorno 1915 players
U.S. Pistoiese 1921 players
S.S. Arezzo players
Serie B players
Serie C players
Serie D players